Shadrach or Shadrack may refer to:

Media
"Shadrack" (Robert MacGimsey song), a 1962 popular song written in the 1930s by Robert MacGimsey
Shadrach (novel), a 1953 children's book by Meindert De Jong
Shadrach in the Furnace, a 1976 novel by Robert Silverberg
"Shadrach," a 1978 short story by William Styron
"Shadrach" (Beastie Boys song), a 1989 single by the Beastie Boys
An Exciting Evening at Home with Shadrach, Meshach and Abednego, a 1989 EP by the Beastie Boys
Shadrach (film), a 1998 movie based on the William Styron short story

People
Shadrach, Meshach, and Abednego, three associated Biblical figures
Shadrach Bond (a.k.a. Shadrack Bond, 1773–1832), first governor of the US State of Illinois
Shadrack Ireland (died 1778), cult leader
Shadrach Kabango, Canadian hip hop musician
S. M. Lockridge (Dr. Shadrach Meshach Lockridge, 1913–2000), late pastor from California
Shadrach Minkins (1814–1875), African American fugitive slave who in 1850 was captured in Boston, held by federal marshals and freed by a group of black men who broke into the courtroom
Shadrach Roundy (1789–1872), early Latter Day Saint leader
Shadrach Woods (1923–1973), American architect, urban planner and theorist
Gracia Shadrack, Vanuatuan politician

Characters
 Shadrach Dingle, a fictional character on the British soap Emmerdale
 Shadrach, a mercenary in the novel Perdido Street Station
 Shadrack, a mentally-ill World War I veteran in the novel Sula by Toni Morrison
Shadrack, an undertaker and employer of the title character in the novel Billy Liar by Keith Waterhouse
 Dr. Gregory Herd, a Marvel Comics character also known as Shadrac
 Shadrack the Great, a headless lion tamer's ghost in 13 Ghosts 
 Shadrach Jones, the titular character in the short story The King of the Elves by Philip K. Dick